Gerard Lettoli (born 18 September 1946) is a Sammarinese former cyclist. He competed in the individual road race at the 1968 Summer Olympics.

References

External links
 

1946 births
Living people
Sammarinese male cyclists
Olympic cyclists of San Marino
Cyclists at the 1968 Summer Olympics
Sportspeople from Seine-Saint-Denis
French male cyclists
French people of Sammarinese descent
Cyclists from Île-de-France